Geoffrey Stuart Watson (3 December 1921 – 3 January 1998) was an Australian statistician.

Watson was born in Bendigo, Victoria in 1921. He studied at the University of Melbourne, and received his PhD at the North Carolina State University in 1951. After taking positions at the University of Melbourne, the Australian National University, the University of Toronto and Johns Hopkins University, he became chair of the Department of Statistics of Princeton University in 1970. He remained there until his death.

Watson developed the Durbin–Watson statistic for detecting autocorrelation with James Durbin of the London School of Economics in 1950.
Watson was especially interested in applications of statistics. He used statistical methods to support the theory of continental drift. He estimated the size of the penguin population in Antarctica, and the effect of repealing the motorcycle helmet law in the United States.

In 1966 he was elected as a Fellow of the American Statistical Association.

He is sometimes confused with the mathematician G. L. Watson, who worked on quadratic forms, and G. N. Watson, a mathematical analyst.

References

 
 New York Times, Geoffrey S. Watson, 76; Wrote Statistics Formula, 18 January 1998.

Interview

 R. J. Beran and N. I. Fisher (1998) A conversation with Geoff Watson, Statistical Science, 75–93 Project Euclid

External links
 

1921 births
1998 deaths
North Carolina State University alumni
Australian statisticians
People from Bendigo
Johns Hopkins University faculty
Princeton University faculty
20th-century American mathematicians
Fellows of the American Statistical Association
Academic staff of the University of Toronto